Zimin (from zima meaning winter) is a Russian masculine surname, its feminine counterpart is Zimina. It may refer to

 Semyon Grigorievich Zimin (1740-1860), Russian entrepreneur 
 Aleksandr Zimin (1920–1980), Russian historian
Anna Zimina (born 1939), Soviet middle-distance runner
Dmitry Zimin (1933–2021), Russian entrepreneur
 Ilya Zimin (1972–2006), Russian TV reporter
 Ivan Zimin , Russian industrialist
 Jim Zimin (1902–1974), Russian-born Australian farmer
Nikolai Zimin (1895–1938), Soviet politician
 Olga Zimina (born 1982), Russian-Italian chess player
 Sergei Zimin (1870–1945), Russian entrepreneur and founder of the Zimin Opera
Valentina Zimina (1899–1928), Russian silent screen actress
Viktor Zimin (politician) (born 1962), Russian politician
Viktor Zimin (football coach) (born 1950), Russian football coach
Yevgeni Zimin (1947–2018), Russian hockey player
Yulia Zimina (born 1981), Russian film actress and TV presenter

See also
Zemina (surname)
Zemin (given name)
Ziming, a given name

References

Russian-language surnames